The 1971 All-Pacific-8 Conference football team consists of American football players chosen for All-Pacific-8 Conference teams for the 1971 NCAA University Division football season. The team was selected by the conference's eight head coaches.

Offensive selections

Quarterbacks
 Don Bunce, Stanford

Running backs
 Bernard Jackson, Washington State
 Bobby Moore, Oregon (later Ahmad Rashad)

Ends/receivers
 Bob Christiansen, UCLA
 Tom Scott, Washington

Flankers
 Steve Sweeney, California

Tackles
 Tom Drougas, Oregon
 John Vella, USC

Guards
 Steve Busch, Washington State
 John McKean, Oregon

Centers
 Dave Dalby, UCLA

Defensive selections

Ends
 John Grant, USC
 Jim Sherbert, Oregon State

Linemen
 Larry Butler, Stanford
 Gordy Guinn, Washington
 Pete Lazetich, Stanford
 Sherman White, California

Linebackers
 Steve Brown, Oregon State
 Willie Hall, USC
 Jeff Siemon, Stanford

Defensive backs
 Bill Drake, Oregon
 Calvin Jones, Washington
 Ron Mims, Washington State
 Ray Youngblood, California

Extra teams

Placekickers
 Don Sweet, Washington State

See also
1971 College Football All-America Team

References

All-Pacific-8 Conference Football Team
All-Pac-12 Conference football teams